is a Japanese footballer who plays as Forward. He currently play for Gainare Tottori.

Career
On 5 January 2019, Tamura joined to J3 club, Fukushima United for ahead of 2019 season.

On 28 January 2021, Tamura abroad to South Korea and transferred to K League 2 club, FC Anyang for 2021 season.

On 22 January 2022, Tamura joined to J3 club, Gainare Tottori for ahead of 2022 season.

Career statistics

Club
Updated to the start of 2023 season.

References

External links

Profile at Kyoto Sanga FC

1995 births
Living people
Association football forwards
Association football people from Nara Prefecture
Japanese footballers
J1 League players
J2 League players
J3 League players
K League 2 players
Kyoto Sanga FC players
Sagan Tosu players
Fukushima United FC players
FC Anyang players
Gainare Tottori players
J.League U-22 Selection players